Impact may refer to:
 Impact (mechanics), a high force or shock (mechanics) over a short time period
 Impact, Texas, a town in Taylor County, Texas, US

Science and technology
 Impact crater, a meteor crater caused by an impact event
 Impact event, the collision of a meteoroid, asteroid or comet with Earth
 Impact factor, a measure of the citations to a science or social science journal

Books and magazines
 Impact (novel), a 2010 novel by Douglas Preston
Impact Press, a former Orlando, Florida-based magazine 
 Impact Magazines, a former UK magazine publisher
 Impact (conservative magazine), a British political magazine
 Impact (British magazine), a British action film magazine
 Impact, a French action film magazine spun off from Mad Movies
 Impact (UNESCO magazine), a former UNESCO quarterly titled IMPACT of science on society
 Impact (student magazine), a student magazine for the University of Nottingham, England
 Bathimpact, the student newspaper for the University of Bath Students' Union, England
 Vice Impact, a channel of Vice Media

Comics
 Impact Comics, a DC Comics imprint
 Impact (EC Comics), a 1955 EC Comics comic book
 Impact (Image Comics), an Image Comics comic book character

Film and television
 Impact (TV programme), a BBC World News weekday programme
 Impact (1949 film), a 1949 film noir starring Brian Donlevy and Ella Raines
 Impact (1963 film), a 1963 crime thriller starring Conrad Phillips
 Impact (mini-series), a 2008 television mini-series starring Natasha Henstridge and David James Elliott
 Impact! (TV series), the flagship television broadcast of the American professional wrestling promotion Impact Wrestling
 Impact (2002 British TV series), a two-part British television miniseries

Record labels
 Impact Records, an American record label
 Impact Records (California), a California record label in the 1960s
 Impact (record label), a New Zealand record label

Albums
 Impact, an album by thrash metal band Dew-Scented
 Impact (1972 Charles Tolliver album), a live album by Charles Tolliver released on Enja Records
 Impact (1975 Charles Tolliver album), a studio album by Charles Tolliver released on Strata-East Records
 Impact (Eye Empire album)

Businesses and organisations
 Impact Confections, a candy company founded in 1981
 Impact! Miniatures, a company producing 28mm wargaming figures
 IMPACT International Multilateral Partnership Against Cyber Threats
 IMPACT, Irish Municipal, Public and Civil Trade Union
 IMPACT, Ironworker Management Progressive Action Cooperative Trust
 IMPACT (British organisation), a charity focusing on public and preventative interventions to stop preventable disability
 IMPACT (Canadian organization), a charity focusing on natural resources in conflict areas
 IMPACT (computer graphics), a computer graphics architecture for Silicon Graphics computer workstations
 Impact Wrestling, a professional wrestling organization founded in 2002

Sport
 CF Montréal, formerly known as Montreal Impact, a soccer (football) team in Major League Soccer, the top tier of North American professional soccer
 Montreal Impact (1992–2011), predecessor to the above team, that played in several second-level North American leagues during its history

Other uses
 Impact (gamer) (born 1995), South Korean League of Legends player
 Impact (typeface), a sans-serif typeface
 Impact evaluation, a way of evaluating changes from an intervention or development programme
 Impact (custom car), a custom-built 1934 Ford roadster

See also
 
 
 Impaction (disambiguation)
 Influence (disambiguation) 
 Effect (disambiguation)
 Collision (disambiguation)